Dragotin Cvetko (19 September 1911 – 2 September 1993) was a Slovenian composer and musicologist.

Early life and education
Dragotin Cvetko was born in Vučja Vas, a village in Styria, Austria-Hungary. He was the son of Fran and Alojzija Cvetko, both schoolteachers in Vučja Vas, and the older brother of the composer Ciril Cvetko (1920–1999). He studied at the Faculty of Arts at the University of Ljubljana (graduating in 1936) and at the Ljubljana Conservatory (graduating in 1937), and continued his education in composition in Prague. He received his doctorate in 1938 with the dissertation Problem občega muzikalnega vzgajanja ter izobraževanja (The Problem of General Music Education).

Second World War
During the Second World War, he served as a delegate at the Assembly of the Delegates of the Slovenian Nation in Kočevje. From 1944 to 1945 he was a committee member of the Research Institute of the Liberation Front of the Slovenian Nation, the main role of which was to research and define the postwar borders of Slovenia. After the war, on 24 July 1946, he married Nives Polak and they had one son and two daughters. In 1947, their daughter , a later prominent linguist, was born to them.

Academic career
He taught at the Academy of Music in Ljubljana from 1938 to 1943 and from 1945 to 1962 with the ranks of assistant, associate, and full professor. From 1962 to 1981 he was a professor of the history of Slovenian and modern world music and the head of the Department of Musicology at the University of Ljubljana's Faculty of Arts. He served as the dean of the Faculty of Arts from 1970 to 1972. In 1982 the University of Ljubljana awarded him the title of distinguished professor. He was the vice president of the International Musicological Society (1967–1972). He became a full member of the Slovenian Academy of Sciences and Arts in 1970, a corresponding member of the Serbian Academy of Sciences and Arts in 1968, a corresponding member of the Croatian Academy of Sciences and Arts in 1979, and an honorary member of the Croatian Music Institute in 1978. He received the Prešeren Award in 1961 for his work Zgodovino glasbene umetnosti na Slovenskem (History of Music in Slovenia), the Herder Prize in 1972, the AVNOJ Award in 1982, and the Kidrič Award in 1988.

He research initially focused on issues of music theory and education, but soon after 1945 he started focusing on music history. He engaged in extensive work based on critical study of sources and issues of musical style to create a solid basis for Slovenian music history, providing an impetus for similar work elsewhere in Yugoslavia. His critical editions of compositions are of exceptional importance; they were the first of their kind in Slovenia (e.g., Skladatelji Gallus, Plautzius, Dolar in njihovo delo, 1963; J. Gallus Carniolus, Harmoniale morales, 1966; J. Gallus Carniolus, Moralia, 1968). He published numerous articles in Yugoslav and international periodicals. He participated in international musicological conferences and delivered talks at various universities and institutions, and also in radio broadcasts.

The Department of Musicology was founded at the University of Ljubljana's Faculty of Arts in 1962 as a result of his efforts. In 1965 he started publishing the journal Muzikološki zbornik (Musicological Proceedings), which included contributions from Yugoslavia and abroad. In 1972 he founded the SAZU Institute of Musicology, which began operating in 1980.

He died in Ljubljana at the age of 82 years. On 18 September 2011, a bust of him was unveiled in his native village of Vučja Vas.

Selected bibliography 
Problem občega muzikalnega vzgajanja ter izobraževanja (The Problem of General Music Education; Ljubljana, 1938) 
 Život i rad kompozitora Rista Savina (The Life and Work of Risto Savin; Belgrade, 1958) 
 Zgodovina glasbene umetnosti na Slovenskem (This History of Music in Slovenia; Ljubljana, 1958–1960) 
 (with Josip Andreis and Stana Đurić-Klajn) Historijski razvoj muzičke kulture u Jugoslaviji (The Historical Develiopment of Musical Culture in Yugoslavia; Zagreb, 1962) 
 Academia Philharmonicorum Labacensis (Ljubljana, 1962) 
 Stoletja slovenske glasbe (Centuries of Slovenian Music; Ljubljana, 1964) 
 Jacobus Gallus Carniolus (Ljubljana, 1965) 
 Jacobus Gallus: sein Leben und Werk (The Life and Work of Jacobus Gallus; Munich, 1972) 
 Musikgeschichte der Südslawen (Music History of the South Slavs; Kassel, 1975) 
 Davorin Jenko (Ljubljana, 1980) 
 Južni Slovani v zgodovini evropske glasbe (The South Slavs in the History of European Music; Maribor, 1981) 
 Glasbeni svet Antona Lajovca = Anton Lajovic und seine Musikwelt (The Musical World of Anton Lajovic; Ljubljana, 1985) 
 Anton Lajovic (Ljubljana, 1987) 
 Iacobus Hándl Gallus vocatus Carniolanus (Ljubljana, 1991) 
 Slovenska glasba v evropskem prostoru = Slovenian Music in Its European setting (Ljubljana, 1991) 
 V prostoru in času: spomini (In Space and Time: Memories; Ljubljana, 1995)

See also
List of Slovenian composers

References

1911 births
1993 deaths
20th-century classical composers
Slovenian classical composers
Slovenian male musicians
Slovenian musicologists
Prešeren Award laureates
University of Ljubljana alumni
Academic staff of the University of Ljubljana
Members of the Slovenian Academy of Sciences and Arts
Male classical composers
People from the Municipality of Križevci
Herder Prize recipients
Yugoslav composers
20th-century musicologists
20th-century male musicians